Wieferich's theorem may refer to one of the following results named after Arthur Wieferich:

 Wieferich's criterion for the solubility of the "First Case"  of Fermat's Last Theorem
 The solution to Waring's problem for cubes, that every integer is the sum of at most 9 cubes